George Gadai Bower (born May 28, 1992) is a New Zealand rugby union. He began his rugby in Wellington playing for Avalon rugby club, following that he made his first-ever representative team playing for Wellington U20s in 2011. His usual position is Prop. He currently plays for Crusaders and Otago.

Rugby career 
In 2014, Bower moved to Dunedin to play for the Harbour Hawks RFC and then played one game for Otago's National Provincial Championship team that year as an injury replacement. Nicknamed the "Fijian Bulldozer", “Humble Horse”, and "The Fijian Prince" by fans, Bower once featured as an extra in an advertisement for the All Blacks.

Bower didn't make an appearance for Otago until 2018 when he was called in as injury cover. Bower managed to play 7 more games for an Otago in 2018.

In 2019 Bower was named in the Crusaders pre season and made his debut in round 4. In November 2019 Bower was named in the 2020 Crusaders Squad.

In October 2020 All Black Coach Ian Foster named Bower as a wider squad member of the All Blacks team to Australia. In 2021 Bower was again named in the wider squad for the Steinlager Series against Fiji and Tonga. He made his international debut for the All Blacks on 3 July 2021 against Tonga at Auckland.

Reference list

External links
 

New Zealand rugby union players
Living people
Rugby union props
1992 births
New Zealand people of Fijian descent
Otago rugby union players
Crusaders (rugby union) players
New Zealand international rugby union players
Rugby union players from Wellington City